Ephormotris cataclystalis is a moth in the family Crambidae. It was described by George Hampson in 1897. It is found in Malaysia and on Borneo.

References

Acentropinae
Moths described in 1897
Taxa named by George Hampson